Saylesville is an unincorporated community located in the town of Rubicon, Dodge County, Wisconsin, United States.

References

External links

Unincorporated communities in Dodge County, Wisconsin
Unincorporated communities in Wisconsin